Naval Battles (full title — Naval Battles:  World War II on the High Seas) is a turn-based, card-driven wargame based on naval combat during World War II.  Designed by Dan Verssen and published by Phalanx Games, the game is playable by 2 or more players, each commanding a fleet with the objective of sinking a certain amount of their opponents' ships.

Each player arranges an initial fleet, with each ship represented by a card.  A reserve fleet is also arranged available to join the battle later as needed.  Additionally, there is a deck of action cards the player draws from.  In the process of their turn, a player plays cards to fire weapons and take other actions.  Attack actions are usually related to a specific type of weapon mount, as detailed on the ship card.  To use the attack card, the player must have a ship with the appropriate weapon mount listed.  Cards may also be played by other players to defend their ships from attack.

Ships represented 

 
 Aircraft Carriers
 Commandant Teste
 Battleships
 Courbet
 France
 Jean Bart
 Paris
 Richelieu
 Cruisers
 Colbert
 Foch
 La Galissonnière
 Suffren
 Destroyers
 Mogador
 Volta
 Submarine
 Saphir
 
 Aircraft Carrier
 Graf Zeppelin
 Battleships
 Bismarck
 Gneisenau
 Scharnhorst
 Tirpitz
 Cruisers
 Admiral Hipper
 Prinz Eugen
 Destroyers
 Erich Giese
 Schnellboot
 T13
 T61
 Submarines
 Type IXA
 Type XXI
 
 Battleships
 Andrea Doria
 Conte de Cavour
 Littorio
 Vittorio Veneto
 Cruisers
 Capitani Romani
 Fiume
 Gorizia
 Muzio Attendolo
 Raimondo Montecuccoli
 Zara
 Destroyers
 Aliseo
 Ciclone
 Submarine
 Adua
 
 Aircraft carriers
 Hiryū
 Shōhō
 Battleships
 Nagato
 Yamato
 Cruisers
 Aoba
 Kashii
 Kashima
 Katori
 Mikuma
 Mogami
 Destroyers
 Kagero
 Shimakaze
 Submarines
 I-174
 
 Aircraft carrier
 
 Battleships
 
 
 
 Cruisers
 
 
 
 
 
 Destroyers
 
 
 
 Submarine
 
 
 Aircraft carriers
 
 
 Battleships
 
 
 
 
 Cruisers
 
 
 
 Destroyers
 
 
 
 Submarines

External links
 

World War II games